W30BX was a television station licensed to Mobile, Alabama. It offered programming from the Home Shopping Network.

The station was previously W52BF and its license transferred to UHF Channel 30 on October 28, 2005. According to the station's coverage map, W30BX served the immediate Mobile area as its primary coverage area, barely reaching beyond the city limits.

The station's license was cancelled by the Federal Communications Commission on November 16, 2012.

External links

30BX
Defunct television stations in the United States
Television channels and stations disestablished in 2012
Television channels and stations established in 2005
2005 establishments in Alabama
2012 disestablishments in Alabama
30BX